The Burroughs File is a collection of short fiction and non-fiction writings by Beat Generation author William S. Burroughs covering a period of more than 20 years (though largely focussing on the seven-year period 1962-69 during which Burroughs' principal literary output appeared in obscure 'little magazines'). The collection was first published in 1984.

The book incorporates several smaller collections that had previously been published separately: The White Subway (Aloes seolA, London, 1973), Die Alten Filme (The Old Movies; Maro Verlag, Augsburg, edited by Carl Weissner, 1979) (most of the material in this book was published in English for the first time in The Burroughs File), The Retreat Diaries (The City Moon Broadcast 3, New York, 1976) and Cobble Stone Gardens (Cherry Valley Editions, edited by Charles and Pam Plymell, New York, 1976). In addition, the book includes visual excerpts from Burroughs' scrapbooks and notebooks dating back to his early days as a writer. Pages 11-12 of The Burroughs File gives a full publishing history of earlier appearances including the original 'little magazine' and journal appearances.

The subject matter of the various stories and essays range widely from material connected to his earlier works such as Naked Lunch, to autobiographical pieces. The Retreat Diaries is a collection of journal entries made by Burroughs during the summer of 1975. Introductory material by others includes "Introductory Notes" by James Grauerholz, "Burroughs in Tangier" by Paul Bowles (first published in Big Table 2, Chicago, 1959) and Whoever Can Pick up a Frying Pan Owns Death" by Alan Ansen (first published in Big Table 2, Chicago,1959 and in Parkinson, Thomas, ed. Casebook on the Beats'', T.Y. Crowell, New York, 19561).  

1984 short story collections
Short story collections by William S. Burroughs
City Lights Publishers books